Discosura is a genus of hummingbird in the family Trochilidae. The thorntails are sometimes placed in the genus Popelairia (Reichenbach, 1854), leaving Discosura for the racket-tailed coquette. On the contrary, some have argued for merging this genus into Lophornis, which they overall resemble, except for the highly modified tail-feathers of the males.

Taxonomy
The genus Discosura was introduced in 1850 by the French naturalist Charles Lucien Bonaparte. Bonaparte did not specify a type species but this was designated as the racket-tailed coquette by George Robert Gray in 1855. The genus name combines the Ancient Greek diskos meaning "plate" with oura meaning "tail".

The genus contains five species.

References

 
Hummingbirds
Taxa named by Charles Lucien Bonaparte
Taxonomy articles created by Polbot